Blood & Oil  is an American prime time television soap opera created by Josh Pate and Rodes Fishburne, that premiered on ABC on September 27, 2015. The series follows a young couple that moves to fictitious Rock Springs, North Dakota, after the biggest oil discovery in American history.

The series features an ensemble cast headed by Don Johnson as oil tycoon Harlan "Hap" Briggs. Blood & Oil also stars Amber Valletta as his catty socialite wife, Carla; Scott Michael Foster as his villainous son Wick; and Miranda Rae Mayo as his illegitimate biracial daughter Lacey who has an affair with Hap's personal driver, AJ Menendez (Adan Canto), who leads a triple life. Chace Crawford and Rebecca Rittenhouse play young couple Billy and Cody LeFever, while India de Beaufort plays bar owner/loan shark Jules Jackman, and Delroy Lindo plays a sly sheriff, Tip Harrison.

The original order of 13 episodes was reduced to 10 on October 23, 2015.

Production

Development 
The project was written by Josh Pate and Rodes Fishburne, with Tony Krantz as executive producer. In September 2011, ABC bought the script (then titled The Bakken) along with several other projects by Krantz, but did not order a pilot for the 2012–13 television season. In October 2014, the project moved to the USA Network under the title Boom and would be produced by ABC, but was never filmed.

On January 30, 2015, it was announced that the project had returned to ABC and had been picked up as pilot, which was filmed in Northern Utah and was directed by Jonas Pate. On May 7, 2015, ABC picked up the pilot to series (still untitled). By May 27, 2015, the title was Oil. On June 1, 2015, it was reported that Cynthia Cidre had been hired as executive producer and co-showrunner of the project, now titled Blood & Oil. On August 5, 2015, it was announced that Cidre would be replaced by Jon Harmon Feldman as showrunner, after the production ran into problems due "to its big scope".

Casting
Casting advertising began in February 2015. Scott Michael Foster landed the role of rich kid Wick. Rebecca Rittenhouse and India de Beaufort were cast in the main female roles. On March 9, it was announced that Don Johnson had landed the leading role as the family patriarch and most powerful man in the town; Johnson is also the series' executive producer. Delroy Lindo was to co-star as the town sheriff. On March 11, Chace Crawford joined the series as a main protagonist, while Yani Gellman and Caitlin Carver were cast as regulars. On March 12, Amber Valletta landed the role of Hap's new wife.

After the pilot was picked up to series ABC started making casting changes. On May 26, 2015, it was announced that Caitlin Carver and Yani Gellman, cast as Lacey Briggs and A.J. Menendez respectively, would leave the show and their roles would be recast. On July 6, 2015, it was announced that Adan Canto would play the role of A.J. Menendez, replacing Gellman. On July 20, 2015, it was announced that Aurora Perrineau had replaced Caitlin Carver in the role of Lacey; the character was changed from white to biracial, since Hap fathered her out of wedlock. On August 4, 2015,  Miranda Rae Mayo replaced Perrineau as Lacey, due to the character's being reconceived to be a bit older.

Several actors were cast in the recurring roles. Yaani King and Keston John were cast as Ada and Kess Eze. On August 21, 2015, it was announced that Wilson Bethel had joined the series as Finn, Eze's business partner. On August 24, 2015, Tara Karsian was cast as local waitress Van Ness. On October 7, 2015, it was revealed that Lolita Davidovich joined the series as Annie Briggs, Hap's ex-wife.

Cast and characters

Regular cast

Don Johnson as Harlan "Hap" Briggs
Chace Crawford as Billy LeFever
Rebecca Rittenhouse as Cody LeFever
Scott Michael Foster as Wick Briggs
Amber Valletta as Carla Briggs
India de Beaufort as  Jules Jackman
Miranda Rae Mayo as Lacey Briggs
Adan Canto as Ahmed "A.J." Menendez
Delroy Lindo as  Tip Harrison

Recurring cast

Barry Corbin as Clifton Lundegren
Peyton List as Emma Lundegren
Paul Rae as Garry Laframboise
Keston John as Kess Eze 
Yaani King as Ada Eze
Wilson Bethel as Finn
Tara Karsian as Van Ness
Lolita Davidovich as Annie Briggs

Episodes

Reception

Critical response
The show has received average reviews from television critics, with several critics comparing the series to Dallas and its 2012 revival. On Rotten Tomatoes, the first season has a "fresh" rating of 62%, based on 42 reviews, with an average rating of 5.9/10. The website's consensus reads, "High stakes and bawdy plots make Blood & Oil's plain premise and characters tolerable." On the review aggregate website Metacritic, Blood & Oil has a metascore of 49 out of 100, indicating "mixed or average reviews" based on 23 critics.

Willa Paskin from Slate said of the show, "Blood & Oil is not a realistic drama but an out-and-out soap opera." David Wiegland of the San Francisco Chronicle had mixed feelings: "You see where all of this is going, of course, but no one is out to surprise viewers with 'Blood and Oil'. This is a soap opera. It may not last as long as either Dallas, but it's working the same territory." Maureen Ryan of The Huffington Post criticized the series, stating "Aside from Don Johnson's canny oil baron, and as we found with the "Dallas" revival, one savvy old dude can't always carry an entire show on his back, especially when the rest of it is so mechanical." The Washington Posts Hank Stuever panned the series outright: "Dreadfully conceived and horribly acted." On the contrary, Gail Pennington of The St. Louis Post-Dispatch had a slightly more positive opinion on Blood & Oil in her review: "The pleasantly fresh setting is the North Dakota oil boom, but the tone is very "Dallas," and the storytelling is as melodramatic as the show's title."

Ratings

References

External links

2010s American drama television series
2015 American television series debuts
2015 American television series endings
American Broadcasting Company original programming
American primetime television soap operas
English-language television shows
Television series by ABC Signature Studios
Television shows filmed in Utah
Television shows set in North Dakota
Works about petroleum